This is a list of Members of Parliament (MPs) elected at the 1900 general election, held over several days from 25 September to 24 October 1900. Keir Hardie and Richard Bell were elected as the first Labour MPs who were not affiliated with the Liberal Party (c.f. Liberal-Labour).

By-elections

7 May 1901: Monmouth Boroughs -- Joseph Lawrence (Conservative) replacing Dr Frederick Rutherfoord Harris (Conservative) who had been unseated after an election petition alleging electoral irregularities was granted on 3 April.

17 May 1901: County Cork Mid -- D. D. Sheehan (Irish Parliamentary Party) replacing Dr Charles K. D. Tanner (Irish Parliamentary Party) who died on 21 April.

31 May 1901: Saffron Walden -- Jack Pease, replacing Armine Wodehouse, who died on 1 May.

26 February 1902: North Kilkenny -- Joseph Devlin (Irish Parliamentary Party), replacing Patrick McDermott (Irish Parliamentary Party), who . . . . . .

March 1902: Wakefield -- Edward Allen Brotherton replacing William Wentworth-FitzWilliam, 7th Earl FitzWilliam, who inherited his title on the death of his grandfather.

4 March 1902: Monaghan South - John McKean (Irish Parliamentary Party) replacing James Daly (Irish Parliamentary Party) who had resigned.

May 1902: Bury -- George Toulmin (Liberal) replacing James Kenyon (Conservative)

5 November 1902: Cleveland -- Herbert Samuel (Liberal) replacing Alfred Edward Pease (Liberal), who resigned due to the bankruptcy of the family firm.

18-19 November 1902: Orkney and Shetland -- Cathcart Wason resigned after defecting from the Liberal Unionist Party to become an Independent Liberal, and won the following by-election

26 February 1903: Perthshire Eastern -- Thomas Buchanan (Liberal) replacing Sir John Kinloch (Liberal), who had resigned.

9 October 1903: Meath South - David Sheehy (Irish Parliamentary Party) replacing James Laurence Carew (Independent Nationalist) who died on 31 August.

1903: Dublin University - James Campbell (Unionist) replacing William Lecky (Unionist) who died on 22 October 1903

15 December 1903: Dulwich - Frederick Rutherfoord Harris  (Conservative) replacing Sir John Blundell Maple (Conservative) who had died

15 December 1903: Lewisham - Major Edward Coates (Conservative) replacing John Penn (Conservative) who had died

19 August 1904: Cork City -- William O'Brien (Irish Parliamentary Party) replacing William O'Brien (Irish Parliamentary Party) after resigning his seat in January

14 June 1905: Cork City -- Augustine Roche (Irish Parliamentary Party) replacing J. F. X. O'Brien (Irish Parliamentary Party) who died on 23 May.

Defections
John William Wilson (MP for Worcestershire North) was elected as a Liberal Unionist, but defected to the Liberal Party sometime between 1900 and 1906.

Sir Michael Foster (MP for London University) was elected as a Liberal Unionist, but defected to the Liberal Party in 1903.

Winston Churchill (MP for Oldham) was elected as a Conservative, but defected to the Liberal Party in 1904.

Edward Hain (MP for St Ives) was elected as a Liberal Unionist, but defected to the Liberal Party in 1904.

Hon. Ivor Guest (MP for Plymouth) was elected as a Conservative, but defected to the Liberal Party in 1904.

J. E. B. Seely (MP for the Isle of Wight) was elected as a Conservative, but defected to the Liberal Party in 1904.

George Kemp (MP for Heywood) was elected as a Liberal Unionist, but defected to the Liberal Party in 1904.

Sir John Dickson-Poynder, Bt (MP for Chippenham) was elected as a Conservative, but defected to the Liberal Party in 1905.

John Eustace Jameson, MP for West Clare UK Parliament Constituency was elected as an Irish Parliamentary Party, but defected to the Irish Unionist Alliance in 1904.

Sources

See also
1900 United Kingdom general election
List of parliaments of the United Kingdom

1900
1900 United Kingdom general election
 List
UK MPs